This is a list of Idaho State Bengals football players in the NFL Draft.

Key

Selections

References

Idaho State

Idaho State Bengals NFL Draft